Wikipedia has several articles cataloging the languages of the world in different ways:

See also 

 Language